Wake or The Wake may refer to:

Culture
Wake (ceremony), a ritual which takes place during some funeral ceremonies
Wakes week, an English holiday tradition
Parish Wake, another name of the Welsh , the fairs held on the local parish's patron saint's annual feast

Entertainment

Film, television, and audio
Wake (2009 film), an independent film
Wake (cancelled film), a cancelled American action thriller film
"Wake" (The Secret Circle), a television episode
The Wake (1986 film), a Canadian drama film
 The Wake (2005 film), a Greek film
The Wake (audio drama), a Doctor Who related audio drama

Literature
Wake (McMann novel), 2008
Wake (Sawyer novel), 2009
Wake (comics), a French comic created by Morvan and Buchet
The Wake (novel), 2014, by Paul Kingsnorth
The Sandman: The Wake, a 1995 graphic novel

Games
Alan Wake, a 2010 video game
Crasher Wake, a Gym Leader in the Pokémon video games

Music
Wake (opera), a 2018 opera by Giorgio Battistelli
The Wake (UK band), a post-punk band
The Wake (American band), a gothic rock band
Wake (Dead Can Dance album), 2003
Wake (Floater album), 2010
Wake (Mortal album), 1994
Wake (Tara MacLean album), 2008
Wake (Trio Töykeät album), 2005
Wake (Lycia album), 1989
Wake (For Today album), 2015
The Wake (IQ album), 1985
The Wake (Scott Kelly album), 2008
The Wake (Voivod album), 2018

Places and schools
Wake, Okayama, Japan
Wake, Virginia, U.S.
Wake County, North Carolina, U.S.
Wake Forest, North Carolina, U.S.
Wake Forest University, Winston-Salem, North Carolina, U.S.
Wake Forest Demon Deacons, this school's athletic program
Wake Island, in the Pacific Ocean
 Bade Airport, the airport in Papua, Indonesia, assigned ICAO code WAKE

Science
WAKE (cipher), a stream cipher
Wake (physics), the region of recirculating flow immediately behind a moving solid body
Wake low, a meteorological phenomenon which can cause high winds
Wake-on-LAN, a signal that activates a device via a network connection
Wake-on-ring, or Wake-on-Modem (WOM), a signal that activates a device via a telephone connection
Wake turbulence, the air turbulence that forms around and behind an aircraft
Wake, a group of vultures

Other uses
WAKE (AM), radio station in Indiana, United States
Wake (sculpture), a 2004 weathering steel sculpture by Richard Serra
Wake (surname)
USS Wake, the only U.S. ship to surrender in World War II.

See also
Awaken (disambiguation)